Generation X is a 1964 192-page book on popular youth culture by British journalists Jane Deverson and Charles Hamblett. It contains interviews with teenagers who were part of the Mod subculture. It began as a series of interviews in a 1964 study of British youth, commissioned by British lifestyle magazine Woman's Own where Deverson worked. The interviews detailed a culture of promiscuous and anti-establishment youth, and was seen as inappropriate for the magazine.

Cultural influences
Generation X, a punk rock band that English musician Billy Idol formed in 1976, was named after the book—a copy of which was owned by Idol's mother.

Notes

External links
The original Generation X - BBC News Magazine article on the book

1964 non-fiction books
Youth culture in the United Kingdom
1964 in the United Kingdom